The  singles competition of the 2018 Ladies Championship Gstaad tennis tournament was held in Gstaad, Switzerland from 16-22 July 2018. Kiki Bertens was the defending champion, but withdrew before the tournament began.

Alizé Cornet won the title, defeating Mandy Minella in the final, 6–4, 7–6(8–6).

This was the last tournament, that former World No. 4 Francesca Schiavone had participated in. She drew her old rival Samantha Stosur in the first round and was defeated.

Seeds

Draw

Finals

Top half

Bottom half

Qualifying

Seeds

Qualifiers

Draw

First qualifier

Second qualifier

Third qualifier

Fourth qualifier

Fifth qualifier

Sixth qualifier

References
Main Draw
Qualifying Draw

Ladies Championship Gstaad
WTA Swiss Open